Worms 2: Armageddon is a 2D artillery turn-based tactics video game developed by Team17 and part of the Worms series, released on July 1, 2009 on Xbox Live Arcade. The game is a follow up to the 2007 Worms game, which in-turn was a port of 2006's Worms: Open Warfare.

A PC port, titled Worms Reloaded, was later released on August 26, 2010.

Gameplay

Single-player modes
 Single-player campaign with 30 missions, of progressing difficulty, and 5 extra missions, which can be bought from the shop.
 Training mode which includes tutorials on aiming weapons and navigating the players Worm around levels. Also includes firing ranges wherein all weapons are available to the player for aiming practice, and can freely spawn enemy worms or targets on the level to fire upon.

Multiplayer
Six game styles are available for local multiplayer matches: Beginner, Standard, Pro, Fort, Rope Racing and Crazy Crates, with Rope Racing only being playable in player and private matches. Ranked matches can only be played with two players, whereas player and private matches support 4 players. Local Match that supports four-player offline matches.

Updates
An update was released in July 2010 called "Worms 2: Armageddon Battlepack". It features 6 new weapons, 10 new forts, 30 all-new single-player deathmatches and body count mode, new game styles and landscapes. The battlepack is also on the PS3. An error occurred with the PS3 version of the battlepack, reducing the amount of landscapes from the map pack severely but this error has been addressed and fixed. The battle pack was released on the App Store on November 29, 2010. There were other updates available such as Mayhem Pack, Retro Pack, Forts Pack, Puzzle pack, Time Attack Pack, with new landscapes, hats and voices for customising the user's team.

PlayStation 3 content
The PlayStation 3 version has hats for Worms to wear in the game, and they include a MotorStorm helmet, a Helghast Mask (from Killzone), a Sackboy, a Lemming and a Buzz wig.

iOS content
The iPhone/iPad version also has platform-specific Worm hats, all themed around Angry Birds. The red bird, yellow bird, black bird, white bird, mustache pig and king pig make up the hats.

Reception

The critics' reaction to the game has been generally positive. It has a rating of 84 out of 100 on Metacritic based on 24 reviews. IGN gave it a score of 8.5/10, concluding: "This is one of the most fun multiplayer games around, and now the single-player campaign provides a satisfying experience, as well". Guy Cocker of GameSpot gave the game 8 out of 10 criticizing its short campaign but praising its high customization.

References

External links
Worms 2: Armageddon entry at developer Team17 

2009 video games
Android (operating system) games
Artillery video games
IOS games
PlayStation 3 games
PlayStation Network games
Strategy video games
Video game sequels
Video games developed in the United Kingdom
 03
Xbox 360 Live Arcade games